Darijo is a Croatian given name, a variant spelling of Dario. Notable people with the name include:

Darijo Biščan (born 1985), Croatian footballer
Darijo Krišto (born 1989), Croatian footballer
Darijo Srna (born 1982), Croatian footballer

Croatian masculine given names
Masculine given names